Samuel J. Dubbin (born June 26, 1955) is an American lawyer, public servant, and Holocaust Survivors' rights advocate.  He is a principal in the law firm Dubbin & Kravetz, L.L.P., a former shareholder in the law firm Greenberg Traurig, and a former partner with Steel Hector & Davis.  A Clinton Administration appointee, he served in the Department of Justice and Department of Transportation.  He has received a Martindale-Hubbell Peer Review Rating of AV and is included in the Bar Register of Preeminent Lawyers.

Dubbin concentrates his practice in the areas of administrative, regulatory, and commercial litigation.  He represents major national and regional companies, not-for-profit associations, governmental entities, and local businesses and individuals in commercial and real estate litigation, as well as matters involving antitrust law, transportation, business regulation, state and local taxation, state and federal safety regulation, public records and open meetings, and land use and zoning. He is best known for his work representing Holocaust Survivors.

Education and early career 
Dubbin received his bachelor's degree in economics, magna cum laude, from Harvard College in 1977.  In 1981, he graduated cum laude from the University of Miami School of Law, where he received the Harvey T. Reid Scholarship and served as an editor of the Law Review.  After law school, Dubbin clerked for the Honorable James Lawrence King, United States District Judge for the Southern District of Florida, from 1981–1982.

Government and community service 
In 1996, Florida Governor Lawton Chiles appointed Dubbin to the Florida Transportation Commission, which provides policy guidance and financial oversight to the Florida Department of Transportation.  He had previously served on the Florida Supreme Court Nominating Commission, also as an appointee of Governor Chiles.

Dubbin also served from 1993 to 1996 as an official in the United States Departments of Justice and Transportation.   He was special assistant to Attorney General Janet Reno and Deputy Assistant Attorney General for Policy Development in the Department of Justice, and later served as chief counsel to the National Highway Traffic Safety Administration (NHTSA) in the Department of Transportation.  At NHTSA, Dubbin was the chief legal officer for the federal agency responsible for setting and enforcing motor vehicle safety and fuel economy standards, supervising rulemaking proceedings and litigation involving manufacturers,  consumer groups, the insurance industry, and other interested parties.

He currently serves on the board of directors of the Greater Miami Jewish Federation, and served for over 8 years as the chairman of the Federation's Jewish Community Relations Council.

Holocaust Era litigation 
Dubbin's chief undertaking has been fighting for the recognition of Holocaust Survivors' rights to regain assets lost to those who profited off the Holocaust.  His firm Dubbin & Kravetz represents Holocaust survivors and survivor organizations, including The Holocaust Survivors Foundation USA, Inc., a national alliance of elected leaders of grassroots Holocaust survivor organizations with thousands of members in 15 states.

Dubbin & Kravetz was one of three firms that successfully represented Hungarian Holocaust survivors seeking restitution and an accounting against the United States government in the Hungarian Gold Train case, which was settled for $25.5 million in 2005 after nearly five years of litigation.  The firm also currently represents Holocaust survivors and heirs of Holocaust victims in litigation against European insurance companies that failed to pay the proceeds of insurance policies issued prior to World War II in federal court litigation, and for recovery of other assets as well.

Dubbin testified on the issue of unhonored insurance policies that were sold to Holocaust victims before the U.S. House Committee on Financial Services in February 2008, and before the U.S. Senate Committee on Foreign Relations on May 6, 2008.

Awards and honors
In 2008, he was honored by the Jewish Museum of Florida as one of seven outstanding Floridians for his service to the Jewish community and his work for Holocaust survivors.

References

External links 
The New York Times quotes Dubbin on the Swiss Banks Holocaust settlement.
The New York Times quotes Dubbin on litigation settlement appropriations.
The New York Times quotes Dubbin on Holocaust Era Insurance Lawsuit result.

Harvard College alumni
University of Miami School of Law alumni
Florida lawyers
1955 births
Living people